Robert Surcouf (12 December 1773 – 8 July 1827) was a French privateer and slave trader who operated in the Indian Ocean between 1789 and 1801, and again from 1807 to 1808, capturing over 40 prizes. He later amassed a large fortune as a ship-owner, from privateering, commercial activities, the illegal slave trade, and as a landowner.

Surcouf started his career as a sailor and officer on the  Aurore, Courrier d'Afrique and Navigateur. Having risen to captain, and in spite of the prohibition of slave trading by the National Convention in 1793, he engaged in the business himself as a captain on Créole. He then captained the merchantman Émilie, on which he engaged in commerce raiding despite lacking a letter of marque. He preyed on British shipping, capturing the East Indiaman Triton, before returning to Île de France in the Indian Ocean, where his prizes were confiscated. He then returned to France, where he obtained prize money from the government.

Returning to the Indian Ocean, Surcouf captained the privateers Clarisse and Confiance, raiding British, American, and Portuguese merchantmen. He  captured the East Indiaman  on 7 October 1800. Returning to France, he was awarded the Legion of Honour and settled as a ship-owner.

He briefly returned to the Indian Ocean in 1807 on the custom-built Revenant before returning to France. There, he armed privateers and merchantmen. His privateers led successful campaigns against British trade in the Indian Ocean and disastrous ones in the English Channel, except for Renard. There were many casualties. After the Bourbon restoration, he organised fishing expeditions to Newfoundland and amassed a considerable fortune. He died in 1827 and is buried in a graveyard at Saint-Malo.

Career

Youth
Robert Surcouf was born 12 December 1773 in Saint-Malo to a family of ship-owners. His father, Charles-Ange Surcouf de Boisgris, was the grandson of Robert Surcouf de Maisonneuve, who had captained the privateer Aimable during the reign of Louis XIV. On his mother's side, Robert  was a distant relative of René Duguay-Trouin. When his parents sent him to Dinan college to become a priest, he fled at age thirteen to enlist on the merchantman Héron, which shuttled between Saint-Malo and Cadiz.

On 3 March 1789, he enlisted as a volunteer on the 700-ton Aurore, a slave ship bound for India under Captain Tardivet. Aurore sailed to Pondicherry and ferried troops bound for Isle de France. On her next journey, seeking to purchase slaves on the Horn of Africa, Aurore was wrecked in the Mozambique Channel, drowning 400 enslaved Africans chained in the orlop. Tardivet chartered the Portuguese San Antoine in October 1790 to return to Port-Louis, but had to divert to Sumatra because of the weather, and only returned to Port-Louis in late 1790, on a French ship via the French colony of Pondicherry. Promoted to officer, Surcouf enlisted on the Courrier d'Afrique, another slave ship, bound for Mozambique under Captain Garnier. Captain Tardivet then brought him over as Lieutenant on his new ship, Revanche. On Revanche, Surcouf made several expeditions off Madagascar.

Surcouf enlisted as a helmsman on the French Royal Navy's 20-gun fluyt Bienvenue, under Lieutenant Haumont, bound for France. Bienvenue arrived at Lorient on 2 January 1792, where Surcouf discovered the political changes France had undergone in the wake of the French Revolution.

After six months, Surcouf enlisted as a lieutenant on the slave ship Navigateur, under Captain Lejoliff. She departed on 27 August 1792 for Mozambique before sailing to Isle de France, where Surcouf was informed on his arrival of the outbreak of the French Revolutionary Wars.

Rising to the rank of captain, Surcouf took command of the brig Créole, a four-gun slave ship. He departed Isle de France on 3 June 1794  for a journey off Africa and Madagascar, and engaged again in slave trading, even though it had been prohibited by the National Convention and the Assembly of Île Bourbon. Upon his return to Isle de France, agents of the Committee of Public Safety inspected Créole for evidence of slave trading, but left empty-handed as Surcouf had already sold his enslaved cargo. When British naval forces arrived to blockade the Isle de France, he served as an auxiliary ensign on the 40-gun frigate Cybèle and participated in the inconclusive Action of 22 October 1794.

Cruise of Émilie and capture of Triton

In the spring in 1795, Surcouf took command of the 180-ton, privateer schooner Modeste, renamed Émilie, with a 32-man crew and four 6-pounder guns, armed by Malroux and Levaillant. Governor Malartic refused to provide a lettre de marque and ordered Émilie to go to the Seychelles to purchase tortoises as food for Isle de France.

Émilie departed on 3 September 1795 with a congé de navigation authorising her to defend herself, but not to take prizes as a privateer. The next day, she made a port call at Saint-Denis before cruising to Mahé. At Sainte Anne Island, two large British ships chased him, but he was able to evade them by sailing through the reefs, at night.

Surcouf then decided to sail to the Mergui Archipelago to load a rice cargo. On 8 December 1795, while in transit, cruising off the Ganges Delta, Surcouf captured his first prize, the ship Penguin, loaded with lumber, on which he detached a prize crew under Lieutenant Péru before sending her to Isle de France.

On 19 January 1796, Surcouf met the pilot ship Cartier leading two merchantmen, the Russel and Sambolasse, through the Ganges delta. He attacked and captured them, finding the merchantmen to be carrying rice. After detaching prize crews, Surcouf transferred his command, along with his remaining 22 crew members and Émilies four guns, to Cartier, which (according to Ambroise Louis Garneray) he renamed Hasard. Surcouf then sent Émilie, under Lieutenant Croizet, together with his prizes, to Isle de France.

On the night of 28 January, Surcouf captured the 12-gun Diana, loaded with 6000 bags of rice. The next day, Cartier met a 26-gun Indiaman, Triton, armed with 12-pounders and a 150-man crew; having decided to attack, and recognising only too late the overwhelming superiority of his opponent, Surcouf, feeling threatened and unable to flee, decided to board her with his 26 men. After haranguing his men, he approached under a British flag, before hoisting French colours at the very last moment and launching a violent assault. In the ensuing 45-minute battle, Triton suffered 5 wounded and 10 killed, including her captain, Captain Burnycat, and the first officer, Picket; The prisoners were transferred to Diana, which Surcouf released against a 30,000 rupee ransom.

Surcouf returned to Ile de France with his prizes, where he arrived on 10 March 1796, although Hasard was captured by HMS Victorious on the journey back. As Émilie had been armed as a merchant rather than a privateer, the Prize court seized her prizes and sold them for the benefit of the State, although their capture was declared to be legal. Surcouf returned to France to claim his prize money, and on 3 September 1797, the government finally granted him 660,000 francs, of which he only received 80,000.

Cruise of Clarisse

In early 1798, after 14 months in Paris, Surcouf took command of Clarisse, a 14-gun privateer brig armed with four 12-pounders, ten 8-pounders, and manned by a 120-strong complement. He departed from Paimboeuf, Nantes, in February 1798, this time with a proper lettre de marque. During the journey to Isle de France, Clarisse chased a British slave ship, which escaped after one of her shots cut off Clarisses foremast tops. Surcouf captured a British brig South of Cape of Good Hope, which surrendered after a warning shot was fired, on which he sent a prize crew under Captain Dujardin, and arrived La Réunion on 5 December.

In early 1799, Surcouf sailed to the city of Susoh in Aceh, on Sumatra, where he found two 20-gun merchantmen anchored in the harbour, in the process of loading pepper; Clarisse dropped anchor close by and opened fire, after which Surcouf sent his older brother Nicolas to head a 20-man board party on Clarisses boats and board the largest of the ships, while he boarded her with Clarisse from the opposite side; assaulted from two sides, she surrendered after a 30-minute battle. The other ship cut her anchor and attempted to flee, but the boats of Clarisse overhauled and captured her without resistance, most of her crew being ashore. Surcouf returned to Île de France with his prizes in June.

On 16 August, Clarisse departed Isle de France for another cruise; she sailed to La Réunion carrying despatches of Malartic to the governor. She then cruised to Java to procure water, where she arrived on 27 September. On 1 October, Surcouf captured a Danish merchantman, which he sent away under Lieutenant Fonroc; on 4 November, the Portuguese merchantman Nostra Signora de la Conception carrying 116 000 piastres; on 6, a British ship laden with a salt; and on 11 November, the 20-gun Auspicious, with a cargo worth 1,032,580 francs.

Surcouf sailed to Mergui to purchase food and free his prisoners, and put to sail on 10 December. En route, he met the fellow French privateer Malartic, under Jean Dutertre; soon after, the privateers met a British frigate, 38-gun frigate HMS Sybille, which gave chase and which Surcouf managed to outsail by throwing eight guns overboard, along with various other implements.

On 1 January 1800, Clarisse captured a large rice-laden merchantman, the British James. On 3 January, she detected two American 16-carronade ships forming a line of battle; although Clarisse lacked the eight guns sacrificed to escape Sybille and 60 of her men detached on her various prizes, Surcouf engaged. Clarisse raked the rear-most ship, the Louisa, and boarded her, while simultaneously firing a broadside on the other ship, Mercury, which attempted to rescue her mate. Nicolas Surcouf led a 30-man boarding party to seize Louisa, while Mercury escaped. Clarisse could not give chase, her bowsprit having been destroyed in the collision with Louisa. Nicolas Surcouf took a prize crew and sailed Louisa back to Port Louis.

Clarisse continued her patrol, capturing the ships Catherine, Haderbux, Anna Maria, Nostra Signora de la Cruz, Louis, Janna, Notre Dame de Bon Succès and Albion, before sailing back to Isle de France with her prizes. She arrived in early February 1800.

Cruise of Confiance and capture of Kent

In May 1800, Surcouf took command of Confiance, a fast 18-gun brig from Bordeaux, with a 150-man complement; the competition with Dutertre for the captainship of Confiance almost degenerated into a duel, and Governor Malartic had to intervene to prevent it, stating that such a confrontation would be "an English victory". The sailor and painter Ambroise Louis Garneray, future biographer of Surcouf, enlisted at this time.

In late April 1800, Confiance cruised off Sunda Strait, where she captured an American ship; she then left the strait to avoid the frigate , which was known to cruise in these waters, and sailed to the Seychelles. There, he escaped a British ship of the line and a frigate, and sailed on to cruise the Bay of Bengal.

On 19 September, Confiance captured Prize, from Calcutta, which had stored eight of her ten guns in her hold to improve her stability. Prize was sent off to Mauritius on the next day with an 85-man prize crew. Surcouf then steered for Ganjam, where he captured three smaller ships.

On 7 October 1800, off Sand Heads, near Calcutta, Confiance met the 40-gun East Indiaman Kent, of 824 tons burthen, under Captain Robert Rivington. Kent had rescued the crew of another ship, Queen, destroyed by fire, and therefore had an exceptionally large complement of 437 men, including her passengers; 300 of them were soldiers and sailors; Surcouf managed to board his larger opponent and, after over an hour and a half of battle across the decks of the ship, seize control of the Kent.

The British had suffered fourteen killed, including the captain, and forty-four wounded, while the French suffered five killed and ten wounded. The privateers were then granted one hour of free pillaging on Kent before Surcouf restored order; however, the female passengers were strictly protected and sentries were placed in front of their apartments. Amongst the prisoners were General Frederick St. John and his wife, Arabella Craven.

The first officer of Confiance, Joachim Drieux, was sent on Kent with a 60-man prize crew, while her passengers were released on a merchantman that Surcouf stopped a few days later. Confiance and Kent arrived at the Rade des Pavillons in Port-Louis in November. The capture of Kent became a sensation, and the British Admiralty issued a reward for the capture of Surcouf.

After her return to Ile de France, Confiance was armed as a merchantman en aventurier with an 89-man crew and loaded with colonial goods for her return to France. On the journey, Surcouf still managed to capture a number of ships, notably the Portuguese Ebre, with eighteen 12-pounder carronades and a 60-man crew; he released her against a ransom of 10,000 piastres and after exchanging her greatmast with that of Confiance.

Upon her return, Confiance ran into the British blockade and was chased by a frigate; Surcouf managed to evade her by throwing overboard all but one of her guns, his boats, anchors, chains and even components of his masts. He eventually arrived at La Rochelle on 13 April 1801.

In France, Navy Minister Truguet attempted to enrol Surcouf in the Navy as an auxiliary officer, which he declined. Hennequin states that Bonaparte himself offered him the rank of Captain and the command of two frigates, which Surcouf declined for fear of losing his freedom of action, and awarded him a Sabre of honour. Surcouf was awarded the Legion of Honour at the founding of the Order, on 19 May 1802.

On 28 May, in Saint-Malo, he married Marie Blaize, who had been his fiancée for two years; over the course of their marriage, they had five children together. Around 1805, Surcouf started to arm privateers in Saint-Malo in partnership with his father-in-law Louis Blaize de Maisonneuve, notably Caroline which captured four ships in the Indian Ocean under Nicolas Surcouf; Marsouin; and Confiance, which took two prizes under Joseph Potier.

Cruise of Revenant

After a five-year retirement, in early 1807, Surcouf ordered the 18-gun Revenant, a privateer which he had built on his own specifications. On 2 March, he departed Saint-Malo with a 192-man crew to cruise off Bengal. On 9 March 1807, while en route, off Madeira, Revenant captured the British slave ship Aun, of sixteen 12-pounders, recently departed from Liverpool, which Surcouf let go for a ransom, after throwing her guns overboard, wetting her gunpowder and destroying some of her sails.

Surcouf arrived at Île de France in June, slipping past the British blockade and capturing several ships on the journey. During the subsequent campaign, which was to be his last, Surcouf captured 16 British merchantmen, partly because they tended to strike their colours as soon as they realised their opponent was Surcouf.

The arrival of Surcouf at Isle de France did not go unnoticed: the authorities and the population reacted with enthusiasm, while British insurance companies on Calcutta doubled the reward for his capture, which amounted to one lakh of rupees, or 250,000 francs. On 3 September 1807, Revenant departed  to cruise off Bengal. On 25 September, she captured the British 12-gun Trafalgar carrying 10,000 bags of rice, and the 14-gun Mangles, carrying 11,000; on the 27th, the 12-gun Admiral Applin, with 9,500 bags of rice; on 1 October, the 1-gun Suzannah, with 5,500 bags of rice; on the 19th, the wood-laden Success, which was burnt; on the 30th, the 12-gun Fortune, which carried no cargo and was sunk; on 15 November, the Indian Macauly; on 18 December, the British 10-gun Sir William Burroughs; on the 30th, the Portuguese Oriente; and on 6 January 1808, the Arab Jem lab Dim. Surcouf sent these with prize crews to Isle de France, and then returned himself on 31 January 1808.

When a British captive officer taunted Surcouf with the words "You French fight for money while we fight for honour", Surcouf replied "Each of us fights for what he lacks most".

Surcouf then gave command of Revenant to his first officer, Joseph Potier. After a short cruise, Potier returned with a 34-gun prize of the Portuguese East India Company, the Conceçáo de Santo Antonio, captured after a one-hour fight.

On 4 July 1808, General Charles Decaen, governor of Isle de France, requisitioned Revenant. She was renamed Iéna, and commissioned under Lieutenant Morice, with Lieutenant de vaisseau Albin Roussin as second officer. Surcouf had an altercation with Decaen but had to renounce his ship. He eventually purchased Sémillante, which he renamed Charles. Returning with this vessel to Saint-Malo, he arrived on 4 February 1809.

Later life

From 1809, Surcouf went into business as ship-owner, and over the years, he equipped a number of privateers: , under Pelletier;  Dorade; Biscayenne; Édouard; Espadon; Ville-de-Caen;  and his last, under Leroux. The British captured all the privateers sent into the Channel, with the exception of Renard. Surcouf also built the brig Fantôme at St. Malo in 1809. Surcouf dispatched Fantôme to Isle de France (Mauritius) in the Indian Ocean on her first voyage where the brig took three  prizes but was captured by the British in 1810 and commissioned into British service as HMS Fantome.

In January 1814, Surcouf was made a colonel in the National Guard of Saint-Malo. During the Hundred Days, he served as a chief of Legion and maintained order. He resigned after the Battle of Waterloo and became a merchant, arming 19 merchantmen and establishing business with Newfoundland.

Between 1814 and 1827, Surcouf organised over 116 commercial expeditions. In 1815, Surcouf engaged in the slave trade, commissioning the ship Africain to transport enslaved Africans from Gabon. Africain conducted another slave trading journey in 1819. Four other expeditions are also suspected of having been slaving runs: that of Marie-Anne in 1819, Adolphe in 1820, and in 1821 Victor and Adolphe, under René Decaen and with Désiré Surcouf as first officer, which sailed under the pretence of sailing to Isle Bourbon (now Réunion), but actually to ferry slaves to Cuba and Philadelphia. 

Surcouf died on 8 July 1827, and was buried in Saint-Malo graveyard with military honours. His tomb features a globe showing the Indian Ocean and an anchor, with the epitaph:

Legacy

Five ships of the French Navy were named after Surcouf, the first three being a steam aviso (sloop),  an armoured cruiser, and a submarine cruiser, which at the time of her launch was the largest submarine in the world. The submarine joined the Free French Naval Forces during the Second World War and disappeared mysteriously after liberating Saint-Pierre and Miquelon. The fourth Surcouf was a large fleet escort destroyer, which was severely damaged in a collision with a Soviet ship, and the fifth is a modern stealth frigate, one of the first stealth combat ships.

A number of legends have grown around Surcouf, he is often stated to have been made a Baron of the Empire, which is untrue. Another legend states that Surcouf had thrown overboard gold seized on Kent but Kent did not carry gold.

There is a tale that in 1816, Surcouf challenged twelve Prussian officers to a duel and defeated all of them except for the last, which he let go "to tell in his country how a former soldier of Napoleon fights"; this story is a fabrication.

Notes

References

Bibliography
 Austen, Harold Chomley Mansfield (1935) Sea Fights and Corsairs of the Indian Ocean: Being the Naval History of Mauritius from 1715 to 1810. (Port Louis, Mauritius:R.W. Brooks).
 
 
 
 
 
 
 
 
 
 
 Phipps, John (1840) A Collection of Papers Relative to Ship Building in India ...: Also a Register Comprehending All the Ships ... Built in India to the Present Time .... (Scott).
 
 
 
 
 
 

1773 births
1827 deaths
People of the Quasi-War
French privateers
French slave traders
People from Saint-Malo
French people of Breton descent
French pirates
French military personnel of the Napoleonic Wars